The Federal Prison Camp, Alderson (FPC Alderson) is a minimum-security United States federal prison for female inmates in West Virginia. It is operated by the Federal Bureau of Prisons, a division of the United States Department of Justice.

FPC Alderson is in two West Virginia counties, near the town of Alderson. A portion of the prison is in unincorporated Monroe County, while the other portion of the prison, including the dormitories, is in unincorporated Summers County. The majority of the prison is in Summers County. Four other area towns, Hinton, Lewisburg, Ronceverte, and White Sulphur Springs, are within commuting distance of FPC Alderson.

History

In the 1920s, there was a shortage of federal prison space for female inmates. Women offenders either were given alternative punishments or were housed alone within all-male institutions. Prison staff and fellow inmates sexually exploited girls and women who were incarcerated in these facilities.

Mabel Walker Willebrandt, the Assistant U.S. Attorney General, first encouraged establishment of a facility for women. FPC Alderson, which opened on April 30, 1927, as the Federal Industrial Institute for Women, was the first federal women's prison in the United States. It was opened during a reform movement in the 1920s to help reform female offenders.

The first warden, Mary B. Harris, was chosen by Mabel Willebrandt. 
Despite later bureau mythology that Alderson opened its doors with moonshining women from the hills of West Virginia, 174 women had been sent to the facility in the first year of operation before its formal November 14, 1928, opening. The West Virginia location was chosen as it was remote enough from major population centers that potential escapes would be less likely while it had sufficient proximity to the American capital.

Serving as a model for prison reform at the time, it was styled after a boarding school offering education with no armed guards. The facility followed a reformatory model with no fenced grounds. The prison consisted of primarily work-oriented facilities designed for minor federal offenders. It originally consisted of fourteen cottages built in a horseshoe pattern on two-tiered slopes. The offenders segregated by race in the cottages and each building contained a kitchen and rooms for about thirty women. The vast majority of the women were imprisoned for drug and alcohol charges imposed during the Prohibition era.

Facility

FPC Alderson is a  facility and is the largest employer in the Alderson, West Virginia area. The prison is about a five-hour driving distance from Washington, D.C.

While there is no barbed wire on the fence surrounding the camp, the prisoners have schedules and each one must work. Inmates get holidays off except those who work in the powerhouse and kitchen. From its beginning, Alderson's staff members have maintained a focus on vocational training and personal growth experiences, with craft-shop activities an integral part of vocational training. Free time is spent walking around the sidewalk that is set between the two dorms as this is within bounds for the inmates. Since 2004 inmates are no longer free to roam the entire campus and are restricted in areas of the prison. They also play recreational activities such as volleyball.

Most of the inmates at FPC Alderson have been convicted of non-violent or white-collar crime. Many are in the drug program and have come from other prisons to attend the program at Alderson. They sleep in bunk beds in two large dormitories. The dormitories each hold over 500 inmates. Each inmate sleeps in a  cinder-block cubicle.

The prison was nicknamed "Camp Cupcake" by members of the news media when Martha Stewart was sentenced to a five-month term there and was referred to as "Yale" by Stewart herself. Local residents have also referred to it as "the college campus." By 2004, according to Alexandra Marks of The Independent, the operating model for Alderson followed "a punitive rather than a rehabilitative model".

John Benish, the former co-manager of the Alderson Hospitality House, a hospitality establishment where families of Alderson inmates stay, said that FPC Alderson is "built like a college campus. There is lot of property, a lot of greenery and there is no barbed wire around." The Alderson facility includes two dormitories with 500 inmates each. Inmates live in two-person cubicles instead of traditional barred prison cells.

As of 2004, most prisoners at Alderson were convicted of recreational drug-related offenses. Esther Heffernan, a sociology professor at Edgewood College, said that throughout history the inmates included "relatives of famous mobsters and grandmotherly women who embezzled money from banks. You've had a real mixture." Hefferman added that in Alderson, which was a "not undesirable" place to be confined, the isolation from urban life could be stressful for inmates. She said that the inmates, "Coming from the streets of New York and D.C.," were awakened at night by crickets and frogs. Prisoners are not permitted to patronize Alderson-area businesses.

The facility allows weekend visits, but special hours are available for holidays. In prior years the families of inmates were allowed past visiting rooms only on Thanksgiving Day when they could also share in a holiday feast for $1.75.

FPC Alderson was one of six federal and state prisons participating in the Paws4prisons service dog training program. This program allowed inmates the opportunity to interact and work with dogs. This included an academic curriculum where inmates first learn how to train "shelter-rescue dogs" and then progress to developing highly trained assistance dogs.

Notable inmates (current and former)
 Inmates released from custody prior to 1982 are not listed on the Federal Bureau of Prisons website.

Violent criminals

Espionage, Smith Act and "Supporting the Enemy in Wartime" prisoners

Corrupt public officials

Financial criminals

Others

See also
Incarceration in the United States
List of U.S. federal prisons

References

External links

FPC Alderson – Federal Bureau of Prisons


Alderson, Federal
Alderson
Alderson, Federal
Alderson, Federal
Alderson, Federal
Historic American Buildings Survey in West Virginia
1928 establishments in West Virginia
Women in West Virginia